Quinton Disheen Dunbar (born July 22, 1992) is an American football cornerback who is a free agent. He played college football as a wide receiver at Florida before signing with the Washington Redskins as an undrafted free agent in 2015, where he converted to cornerback. He has also been a member of the Seattle Seahawks, Detroit Lions, Arizona Cardinals, and Green Bay Packers.

College career
A 4-star recruit, Dunbar accepted an athletic scholarship to attend the University of Florida over offers from Arkansas, Central Florida, Florida International, Michigan, Purdue, Tennessee, and West Virginia. He played for coach Urban Meyer and coach Will Muschamp's Florida Gators football team from 2010 to 2014. Dunbar was a wide receiver for the Gators over five seasons. In his freshman season, he played in one game in 2010 against the Miami RedHawks on opening day and ultimately redshirted.

Statistics

Professional career

Washington Redskins

2015
Dunbar went undrafted in the 2015 NFL Draft and signed a three-year contract with the Washington Redskins. Dunbar entered training camp as a backup wide receiver and special teams player and competed for a roster spot. On August 7, 2015, it was reported that the Washington Redskins decided to change Dunbar's position from wide receiver to cornerback. Dunbar was moved to cornerback after coaches recognized his ability to successfully jam flyers during punt returns. The position change was also due to multiple injuries to the Redskins' secondary and was also done to give Dunbar a better opportunity to make the roster. In a corresponding move, Dunbar changed his jersey number from No. 17 to No. 47.

On September 5, 2015, Dunbar was waived as part of the team's final roster cuts, but was signed back to their practice squad the following day. On September 29, 2015, the Washington Redskins promoted Dunbar to their active roster. Head coach Jay Gruden named Dunbar the fifth cornerback on the depth chart, behind DeAngelo Hall, Chris Culliver, Bashaud Breeland, and Will Blackmon.

On October 4, 2015, Dunbar made his professional regular season debut during the Redskins' 23–20 win against the Philadelphia Eagles in Week 4. He was inactive for the Redskins' Week 10 win against the New Orleans Saints as a healthy scratch. Dunbar became the third cornerback on the depth chart in November after the Redskins decided to move cornerback DeAngelo Hall to safety and placed Chris Culliver on injured reserve with a torn ACL and MCL. On November 29, 2015, Dunbar recorded two solo tackles, deflected two passes, and made his first career interception during a 20–14 victory against the New York Giants in Week 12. He made his first career interception off a pass by Giants' quarterback Eli Manning in the endzone, but exited the game shortly thereafter due to a dislocated finger. In Week 14, Dunbar earned his first career start and made two combined tackles in a 24–21 win at the Chicago Bears. Dunbar was inactive for the Redskins' Week 17 win at the Dallas Cowboys as a healthy scratch. Head coach Jay Gruden decided to rest him, along with multiple starters, as the Redskins had already clinched a playoff berth with a 9–7 record. He finished his rookie season in 2015 with 13 combined tackles (11 solo), five pass deflections, and an interception in 11 games and two starts.

On January 10, 2016, Dunbar appeared in his first career playoff game and made five solo tackles and broke up two passes in the Redskins' 35–18 loss to the Green Bay Packers in the NFC Wildcard Game.

2016
Throughout training camp, Dunbar competed to be the third cornerback on the Redskins' depth chart against Dashaun Phillips and rookie Kendall Fuller. Head coach Jay Gruden named Dunbar the third cornerback on the depth chart to start the regular season, behind starters Josh Norman and Bashaud Breeland.

On September 25, 2016, Dunbar recorded three solo tackles, a pass deflection, intercepted a pass by Giants' quarterback Eli Manning in the end zone, and made his first career reception after catching a 31-yard pass from punter, Tress Way, on a fake punt play during their 29–27 win at the New York Giants in Week 3. In Week 5, he collected a season-high five solo tackles during a 16–10 win at the Baltimore Ravens in Week 5. On December 19, 2016, Dunbar deflected two passes, made one tackle, and made his first career sack on Panthers' quarterback Cam Newton in the Redskins' 26–15 loss to the Carolina Panthers in Week 15. He exited the game in the third quarter after suffering a concussion and was sidelined for the last two games (Weeks 16–17). Dunbar finished the 2016 NFL season with 26 combined tackles (23 solo), five pass deflections, one interception, and a sack in 14 games and two starts.

2017
On January 6, 2017, the Washington Redskins announced their decision to fire defensive coordinator Joe Barry and defensive backs coach Perry Fewell after the defense finished the previous season ranked 28th in the league in total yards. On January 23, 2017, the Washington Redskins promoted outside linebackers coach Greg Manusky to defensive coordinator. During training camp in 2017, Dunbar competed to be the Redskins' nickelback against Kendall Fuller and rookie Fabian Moreau. Head coach Jay Gruden named Dunbar the third cornerback on the depth chart to start the season, behind starters Josh Norman and Bashaud Breeland.

In Week 6, he collected a season-high eight combined tackles and deflected two pass during a 26–24 victory against the San Francisco 49ers. The following week, Dunbar recorded four solo tackles, broke up two passes, and made his third career interception off a pass by Eagles' quarterback Carson Wentz in the Redskins' 34–24 loss at the Philadelphia Eagles in Week 7. Dunbar was inactive for the Redskins' Week 11 loss at the New Orleans Saints due to an undisclosed illness. Dunbar completed the 2017 NFL season with 35 combined tackles (30 solo), eight passes defensed, and an interception in 15 games and four starts.

2018
On January 1, 2018, the Washington Redskins signed Dunbar to a three-year, $10.50 million contract that includes $5.25 million guaranteed and a signing bonus of $3 million.

Dunbar entered training camp slated as a starting cornerback after Bashaud Breeland departed in free agency and Kendall Fuller was traded to the Kansas City Chiefs. On June 15, 2018, Dunbar officially changed his jersey number from No. 47 to No. 23. He changed his number to No. 23 after it became available following the departure of longtime veteran DeAngelo Hall. Head coach Jay Gruden named Dunbar and Josh Norman the starting cornerbacks to begin the regular season in 2018. They started the season alongside safeties D. J. Swearinger and Montae Nicholson.

On September 9, 2018, Dunbar recorded five combined tackles, made a career-high three pass deflections, and intercepted a pass by quarterback Sam Bradford during a 24–6 victory at the Arizona Cardinals in Week 1. He played in seven games before being placed on injured reserve on December 5, 2018, with a leg injury.

2019
In week 4 against the New York Giants, Dunbar intercepted rookie quarterback Daniel Jones twice in the 24–3 loss.
In week 6 against the Miami Dolphins, Dunbar recorded an interception off Josh Rosen in the 17–16 win.
In week 12 against the Detroit Lions, Dunbar intercepted his former QB at University of Florida, Jeff Driskel, which set up the game winning field goal to beat the Lions. In Week 14, he suffered a hamstring injury, which knocked him out the next two games before being placed on injured reserve on December 24, 2019. He finished the season starting 11 games, recording 37 tackles, eight passes defensed, and a career-high and team-leading four interceptions.

Seattle Seahawks
On March 24, 2020, Dunbar was traded to the Seattle Seahawks for a fifth-round pick in the 2020 NFL Draft. He was placed on the commissioner's exempt list on July 27, 2020, following his May 2020 arrest. He was removed from the commissioner's exempt list on August 9, after the charges against him were dropped.

In Week 2 against the New England Patriots on Sunday Night Football, Dunbar recorded his first interception as a Seahawk off a pass thrown by Cam Newton during the 35–30 win. He was placed on injured reserve on November 19, 2020, with a knee injury. He was designated to return from injured reserve on December 9 and began practicing with the team again, but underwent knee surgery on December 29 and did not return for the remainder of the season.

Detroit Lions
Dunbar signed with the Detroit Lions on April 6, 2021, but was released prior to playing any games on August 12, 2021.

Arizona Cardinals
On September 29, 2021, Dunbar signed with the Arizona Cardinals practice squad. He was released on October 5.

Green Bay Packers
Dunbar signed with the Green Bay Packers practice squad on October 13, 2021. He was released on October 19.

Personal life
Dunbar's cousin is NFL linebacker Denzel Perryman. Dunbar has one daughter, Denim, who was born in July 2016.

On May 14, 2020, an arrest warrant was issued by the Miramar Police Department, alleging Dunbar committed armed robbery alongside New York Giants cornerback Deandre Baker at a party the day before. On May 15, 2020, his attorney claimed to be in possession of affidavits from witnesses that state that Dunbar was not involved in the robbery. The next morning on May 16, 2020, both Dunbar and Baker turned themselves in to the police. The following day it was announced that Dunbar had posted bail for $100,000. Dunbar pleaded not guilty to charges. On August 7, 2020, all charges against Dunbar were dropped by Broward County prosecutors. Broward State Attorney Mike Satz announced Baker was charged with 4 counts of robbery with a firearm, and he was facing 10 years to life in prison if convicted. Dunbar was not charged. There was evidence provided by the state attorneys office that the alleged victims accepted $55,000 in exchange for changing their story in regards to Dunbar. Despite the fact that the witnesses by their own testimony appear to be paid off, the state attorney case filer, Alex Urella, still filed against Baker.

References

External links
Florida Gators profile

1992 births
Living people
Booker T. Washington Senior High School (Miami, Florida) alumni
Players of American football from Miami
American football cornerbacks
American football wide receivers
Florida Gators football players
Washington Redskins players
Seattle Seahawks players
African-American players of American football
Detroit Lions players
21st-century African-American sportspeople
Arizona Cardinals players
Green Bay Packers players